Szuć  is a village in the administrative district of Gmina Jedwabno, within Szczytno County, Warmian-Masurian Voivodeship, in northern Poland.

In the Middle Ages there was a settlement of Yotvingians in the area. The village name comes from the Old Prussian word Suckans, meaning "fish".

In 2007 the village had a population of 244.

References
Footnotes

Bibliography
 Sławomir Ambroziak „Szuć. Dzieje mazurskiej wsi” in: Rocznik Mazurski Tom VII 2003

Villages in Szczytno County